is a Japanese short-track speed skater, who won a bronze medal in the 5000 m relay at the 1992 Winter Olympics together with teammates Tatsuyoshi Ishihara, Toshinobu Kawai and Tsutomu Kawasaki.

External links
 
 
Yuichi Akasaka at ISU

Yuichi Akasaka at the-sports.org

1967 births
Living people
Japanese male short track speed skaters
Short track speed skaters at the 1992 Winter Olympics
Short track speed skaters at the 1994 Winter Olympics
Olympic short track speed skaters of Japan
Medalists at the 1992 Winter Olympics
Olympic medalists in short track speed skating
Olympic bronze medalists for Japan
Short track speed skaters at the 1986 Asian Winter Games
Medalists at the 1986 Asian Winter Games
Asian Games medalists in short track speed skating
Asian Games gold medalists for Japan
20th-century Japanese people